Brunswick Pro Bowling is a video game developed by Point of View, Inc. and published by Crave Entertainment. The game features many Brunswick -labeled products such as Brunswick bowling balls and pinsetters. The game was released for the Wii, PlayStation 2 and PlayStation Portable on August 28, 2007. A version for iOS was released in October 2009 but was later removed. It was replaced by the FarSight Studios version in February 2015, also being released on Android as well. FarSight Studios developed versions of the game for the PlayStation 3 and Xbox 360, which support the PlayStation Move and Kinect respectively. An updated version developed and published by Alliance Digital Media for the PlayStation 4, and Xbox One was released on November 23, 2015. The Wii U version was released on January 21, 2016.

Gameplay 

The game has a free play mode, in which up to four players can play against each other in a match. In the career mode players work their way up from an amateur to professional bowler and a multiplayer mode lets up to four players compete against each other. The PSP version includes wireless multiplayer and additional character customization. The Wii version uses the Wii's tilt sensor to simulate a real swing.

Reception 

The reception of Brunswick Pro Bowling has been mixed. Most critics praised the realistic physics of the game. However, others were annoyed by the fact that the Wii version has flaws with its controls. Players have complained that the on-screen bowler moves slowly and does not go with their own movements, therefore making the release confusing and shots hard. Reviewers did however note there was some considerable depth if the player was to play longer.

References 

2007 video games
Bowling video games
Crave Entertainment games
FarSight Studios games
PlayStation 2 games
PlayStation Portable games
PlayStation 3 games
PlayStation 4 games
PlayStation Move-compatible games
Video games developed in the United States
Wii games
Wii U games
Wii U eShop games
Xbox 360 games
Xbox One games
Kinect games
Multiplayer and single-player video games
505 Games games